Miodrag Ćirković (Serbian Cyrillic: Миодраг Ћирковић; born 23 October 1965) is a Serbian retired footballer.

References

1965 births
Living people
Kosovo Serbs
People from Kosovo Polje
Serbian footballers
FK Sarajevo players
NK Maribor players
FK Sutjeska Nikšić players
Association football midfielders
Serbian football managers
Leonidio F.C. managers
Kastoria F.C. managers
Platanias F.C. managers
Ionikos F.C. managers
Ilioupoli F.C. managers
Trikala F.C. managers
Diagoras F.C. managers
Serbian expatriate football managers
Expatriate football managers in Greece
Serbian expatriate sportspeople in Greece